Roggenstede is a village of Dornum township, Landkreis Aurich, Ostfriesland, Lower Saxony, Germany.

The place is bounded by the Dornumersieler Tief (in the North/Northeast), the Schleitief (in the Southeast), the Otjetief (in the South), the Alte Tief (in the West) and covers an area of about 5,6 square kilometers. The distance to the North Sea is about 5,5 km air-line distance.

Neighbouring places are Fulkum, Utarp and Westerbur.

The postal code of Roggenstede is 26553, the area code is +49 (0) 49 33.

External links
http://www.kirchenkreis-harlingerland.de/kg/roggenstede/roggenstede.html

Villages in Lower Saxony
Towns and villages in East Frisia